See detailed article Khukhrain
Chhachi (or Chachi, Chhachhi) is a west Punjabi clan and does not belong to khukhrain community. Chhachis live in India and Pakistan and are Hindu, Sikh or Muslim.

In Pakistan Chhachi's or Chachi's are settled in Bhera, Attock, Rawalpindi and Hazara.

Majority of the Chhachis or Chachis are ethnically Pathan and their ancestory tracks back to Afghanistan.

See also
Khatri
Hindki
Hindkowan

References

Ethnic groups in India
Surnames
Punjabi tribes
Social groups of Pakistan